is a Japanese triathlete. She competed at the 2008 and 2012 Summer Olympics.

References

External links
 

1983 births
Living people
Japanese female triathletes
Olympic triathletes of Japan
Triathletes at the 2008 Summer Olympics
Triathletes at the 2012 Summer Olympics
Sportspeople from Tokyo
Asian Games medalists in triathlon
Triathletes at the 2014 Asian Games
Asian Games silver medalists for Japan
Medalists at the 2014 Asian Games
20th-century Japanese women
21st-century Japanese women